Dubrovnik Hydro Power Plant is a large power plant in Croatia that has two turbines with a nominal capacity of 125 MW each having a total capacity of 250 MW.

It is operated by Hrvatska elektroprivreda.

External links

Hydroelectric power stations in Croatia
Buildings and structures in Dubrovnik-Neretva County
Trebišnjica